Ann Dixon may refer to:

Ann Dixon, character in The Road to Ruin (1934 film)
Ann Dixon; see National Outdoor Book Award

See also
Anne Dixon (disambiguation)